KFXP may refer to:

 KFXP-LP, a low-power radio station (98.7 FM) licensed to serve Wenatchee, Washington, United States
 KVUI, a television station (channel 31) licensed to serve Pocatello, Idaho, United States, which held the call sign KFXP from 1998 to 2015